Pentathlon at the Olympics may refer to:

Modern pentathlon at the Summer Olympics
Athletics pentathlon at the Summer Olympics